The Battle of Boyacá (1819), was the decisive battle that ensured the success of Bolívar's campaign to liberate New Granada. The battle of Boyaca is considered the beginning of the independence of the north of South America, and is considered important because it led to the victories of the battle of Carabobo in Venezuela, Pichincha in Ecuador, and Junín and Ayacucho in Peru.

New Granada acquired its definitive independence from the Spanish Monarchy, although fighting with royalist forces would continue for years.
 
Brigadier Generals Francisco de Paula Santander and José Antonio Anzoátegui led a combined republican army of Newgranadians to defeat in two hours a Royalist  Newgranadian forces led by Spanish Colonels José María Barreiro and Francisco Jiménez.

The battle occurred 150 km from Bogotá in the Andes Mountains, in a place known as Casa de Teja, close to a bridge over the Teatinos River and 3 roads heading to Samaca, Motavita and Tunja, an area which is now part of the Boyacá Department.

Battle

On August 7, 1819, after Bolívar secured a narrow victory at the Battle of Vargas Swamp, both armies headed towards Bogotá, which was lightly defended. The capture of the capital in the hands of the Patriot Army would effectively cut off the advance of the republican army and give the strategic initiative to its opponents. At 6:00 a.m., the Spanish forces (Newgranadians-Venezuelan loyalist soldiers) departed from Motavita towards Casa de Teja, a distance of only 25 km which the Spaniards completed in 7 hours 30 minutes, at an average pace of 18 minutes per kilometer. At 10:00 a.m. General Santander's forces departed from Tunja toward Casa de Piedra and the road to Bogota. The Patriot forces completed the 16 km in 4 hours (at an average pace of 15 minutes per kilometer). 

The Republican forces split in two: the vanguard reached Casa de Teja at 1:30 p.m., while the rearguard stopped a kilometer and a half behind to get some rest. Shortly before 2:00 p.m., Captain Andres Ibarra and his forces spotted Casa de Teja and the vanguard of the Republican Army. The Spaniards spotted him too, and Colonel Sebastian Dias, chief of the vanguard of the Spanish army ordered to follow and engage what he believed was only a small observation force. They returned and General Santander ordered Lieutenant Colonel Paris to attack the Royalist forces.

The Spanish vanguard crossed a strategic bridge over the Teatinos River and took attack positions there. Meanwhile, the full force of the Patriot army under Santander had reached Casa de Piedra. The Spanish rearguard was still several kilometers behind, so General Anzoátegui ordered to block the way between the vanguard and the rearguard of the Spanish forces. The rearguard, outnumbered, retreated to a small hill close to Casa de Piedra.

Simón Bolívar's forces arrived from Paipa, after the Battle of Vargas Swamp. The number of troops of the revolutionary army was around 2850–2900 according to modern estimates. He ordered a flank attack on the Spanish rearguard: battalions Barcelona and Bravos de Paez were to attack on the right side while the Legion Britanica and Rifles Battalion attacked on the left. The British Legion was a special forces squad composed of British and Irish people, which aided the revolutionary army in certain key battles for independence in South american countries. The enemy assumed battle positions: in the center were three artillery pieces surrounded by royal battalions 12 and 22, and on the wings, cavalry units. Arthur Sandes commander of Rifles Battalion charges the royalist artillery. Outnumbered, the Spanish rear guard began to retreat without any clear direction. Therefore, Bolívar ordered lancers units to attack the center of the Royalist infantry, while a full cavalry squadron ran away from the battle via the road towards Samaca. Barreiro attempted to break the blockage of the Patriot forces and rendezvous with the Spanish vanguard but heavy enemy fire forced him and his forces to surrender.

Meanwhile, one kilometer and a half behind Casa de Piedra, the Patriot vanguard managed to ford the river and was approaching the rear of the Royalist vanguard force. Once it reached them, the vanguard forces engaged in battle, while the rearguard attempted to cross the river by force, using bayonets. The Spanish forces fled, leaving on the bridge their leader, Coronel Juan Taira. As the assembly of enemy prisoners began, the battle was over shortly after 4:00 p.m.

At least 1,600 troops and several of the Spanish commanders, including Barreiro himself, were captured at the end of the battle. New Granada's liberation was assured by this victory, which left the road to Bogotá and the city itself practically undefended, as the survivors headed towards other locations. After the battle, Santander and Anzoátegui were promoted to divisional general. On the orders of Santander, Colonel Barreiro and 38 more were executed in Bogotá on October 11, 1819, because of the Decree of War to the Death.

The bridge in question, el Puente de Boyacá, is no longer in use but it has been maintained as a symbol of the Independence of South America.

Historical consequences and legacy

 The final defeat of Royal forces in the New Kingdom of Granada and the weakening of the rest of the forces in all America.
 The end of Spanish control over the American provinces, with the escape of viceroy Juan de Samano.
 The creation of Gran Colombia.
 The start of an autonomous government in the former Spanish provinces.
 The subsequent independence of Venezuela, Peru, Ecuador and the creation of Bolivia, after a liberation campaign.

Viceroy Juan de Samano was informed of the defeat and managed to escape, which brought to an end the reign of the Spanish Empire in northern Latin America. In commemoration of this battle, August 7 is a national holiday in Colombia. On this date every 4 years the elected President of Colombia is proclaimed in the Casa de Nariño.

Bogotá starts the usual celebrations one day in advance in commemoration of the foundation of the city, on August 6, 1538.

References

External links
 
 

Conflicts in 1819
Boyaca 1819
Battles of the Spanish American wars of independence
Boyacá
1819 in Colombia
1819 in Venezuela
August 1819 events